Francis Xavier Bushman (January 10, 1883 – August 23, 1966) was an American film actor and director.  His career as a matinee idol started in 1911 in the silent film His Friend's Wife. He gained a large female following and was one of the biggest stars of the 1910s and early 1920s.

Bushman, like many of his contemporaries, broke into the moving picture business via the stage. He was performing at Broncho Billy Anderson's Essanay Studios in Chicago, Illinois, where he was first noticed for his muscular, sculpted frame. He appeared in nearly 200 feature film roles—more than 175 films before 1920, and 17 in his screen debut year of 1911 alone. He also worked for the Vitagraph studio before signing with Metro in 1915.

Biography

Bushman was born in Baltimore, Maryland. As a young man he joined the Maryland Athletic Club and began a body building regimen that would give him his famous film physique. He cited Eugen Sandow as one of his body building influences. In New York City, he worked as a sculptor's model, often posing in the nude in sessions. In 1902, he married seamstress Josephine Fladine Duval. By the launch of his film career, the couple had five children.

After appearing in theater, Bushman was hired by Essanay Studios in Chicago in 1911, launching his film career and stardom.  Over the next five years he appeared generally as the leading man in over a hundred silent films for the studio.  The studios publicity department kept secret his marriage from his fans, who sent him thousands of letters, including marriage proposals.

In 1918, he was the subject of a national scandal as his affair with longtime costar Beverly Bayne became public. Three days after his divorce with Josephine was final, Bushman and Bayne were married; they would eventually have a son. Bushman and his studios had kept his marriage secret for fear of losing popularity. He was married four times.

In late 1919 and 1920, Bushman and Bayne co-starred in the stage play The Master Thief, from a story by Richard Washburn Child, which successfully toured the country.

Bushman eventually retained the services of Harry Reichenbach as his agent.  When Bushman noted that he would be well-suited to starring in the upcoming 1925 film, Ben-Hur, Reichenbach had a plan to increase his client's marketability. From a railway station, Reichenbach took Bushman to see studio executives, while dropping pennies to the street from his pocket. Many people followed the two, picking up the coins along the way. The crowd gave the studio executives an impression that Bushman was very popular and they cast him as Messala. Bushman was concerned that playing a villain would affect his career, so he asked the advice of William S. Hart, who had played the part on stage for years. "Take it," Hart advised. "It's the best part in the play!" Unlike Ramon Novarro, the star of the picture, Bushman knew how to properly drive a team of horses and a chariot without getting severely injured or killed in the process. When Ben Hur was remade in 1959, Charlton Heston had to learn the technique and quipped "The only man in Hollywood who can drive a chariot is Francis X. Bushman—and he's too old!"

At the peak of his career, Bushman was advertised as "The Handsomest Man in the World". He was also known as "the King of Photoplay" or "the King of Movies" before those titles were more popularly attached to Clark Gable.

Bushman was paid large salaries during his screen career, and donated the land upon which Sid Grauman erected his famous Chinese Theater. But his fortune was wiped out in the Wall Street Crash of 1929, and his career as a movie star had had its run. After his film career had waned, Bushman made his broadcasting mark on the CBS Radio network's long-running dramatic serial entitled Those We Love. In the soap opera, which ran from 1938 to 1945, he played the role of John Marshall, father of twins played by Richard Cromwell and Nan Grey. Robert Cummings rounded out the cast. Bushman took small roles in pictures and attempted to run a few small businesses, all of which lost money. On viewing one of his early films, Bushman is said to have remarked, "My God, look at that! I'm putting all my emotion into my chin!"

In later years, Bushman made assorted guest appearances on American television in the 1950s and 1960s.  On February 6, 1958, he and his wife Iva Millicent Richardson appeared on the quiz show You Bet Your Life with Groucho Marx and won $1,000 by successfully answering questions in a geography quiz. He also performed on weekly sitcoms and television dramas, including Burns and Allen, Peter Gunn, Make Room for Daddy, The Many Loves of Dobie Gillis, Perry Mason, The Adventures of Ozzie and Harriet, and Dr. Kildare.  Bushman guest-starred as well in 1966 on a two-part episode of Batman. Both Bushman and Neil Hamilton, his co-star in The Grip of the Yukon, appeared in the Batman episode—their first reunion acting together in 38 years. Bushman's role as a wealthy collector of silent pictures and promoter of a silent film festival (Batman episodes 31 & 32) was his last appearance on camera.

Francis X. Bushman is mentioned numerous times by the character Pearl Bodine in the first season of The Beverly Hillbillies. In the episode entitled "No Place Like Home," Pearl has written a song which she plays when the silent version of "Ben-Hur" is shown in the Clampetts' hometown. In a later episode, when Pearl visits the Clampetts in Los Angeles, she speaks about hoping to meet Francis X. Bushman. In the episode "Jed's Dilemma," Jed takes the family on a sightseeing tour of Beverly Hills. When passing a fancy home, Pearl wonders if it could be the home of a movie star, possibly Francis X. Bushman. Jed tells her it can't be Bushman's home, because he got a good look in the yard and didn't see room for horses or a chariot.

Francis X. Bushman suffered a heart attack and died at his home in Pacific Palisades, California, on August 23, 1966. He was interred at Forest Lawn Memorial Park Cemetery in Glendale, California.

Filmography
see Francis X. Bushman filmography

Television

Legacy
His son Ralph Everly Bushman (1903–1978) had a film career from the 1920s through the 1940s. Tall (6'4") and good-looking, he was in over 40 films, often playing stuffy upper-class types or menacing gangsters.  In Brown of Harvard (1926) he was cast against William Haines and Jack Pickford. He was often billed as "Francis X. Bushman Jr."

Francis Bushman's granddaughter, Barbara Bushman Quine [1925-2013], married actor Harry Morgan. A grandson, Pat Conway (1931–1981), the son of film director Jack Conway and Bushman's daughter, Virginia, starred on the ABC western television series Tombstone Territory.

For his contributions to the film industry, Bushman was inducted into the Hollywood Walk of Fame in 1960 with a motion pictures star located at 1651 Vine Street.

References

Further reading

External links

 
 
 
 
 Francis X. Bushman Silent Movie Star

1883 births
1966 deaths
American male film actors
American male silent film actors
American male radio actors
Burials at Forest Lawn Memorial Park (Glendale)
Male actors from Baltimore
Vaudeville performers
20th-century American male actors